Nuncia María Tur (born 1940) is an Argentine botanist. She is a researcher in the Vascular Plants Division, Faculty of Natural Sciences, the National University of La Plata. Her work has focused on aquatic plant species, and specializes in Podostemaceae.

Selected works
 1997. Taxonomy of Podostemaceae in Argentina. Aquatic Bot. 57: 213-241

References

Bibliography

Argentine women scientists
Botanists with author abbreviations
20th-century Argentine botanists
1940 births
Living people
21st-century Argentine botanists